The 1954 West Virginia Mountaineers football team was an American football team that represented West Virginia University in the Southern Conference (SoCon) during the 1954 college football season. Led by fifth-year head coach Art Lewis, the Mountaineers compiled an overall record of 8–1 with a mark of 3–0 in conference play, winning the SoCon title for the second consecutive season.

Schedule

Roster

References

West Virginia
West Virginia Mountaineers football seasons
Southern Conference football champion seasons
West Virginia Mountaineers football